The Cherokee Nation of Mexico, also known as the Cherokee Nation of Sequoyah of Mexico, Texas, and U.S.A. Reservation and Church is an organization of individuals who claim descent from Cherokee tribe who migrated to Mexico during the 19th century. They are an unrecognized tribe with a presence in Zaragoza, Coahuila, Mexico. According to Robert J. Conley, the Cherokee Nation of Mexico is recognized by the state of Coahuilla.

Their chief is Charles L. Rogers. Charles L. Rogers, the Ancient Cherokee Church of Mexico, the Cherokee Nation of Mexico, and the Native American Church sued American Express Bank and others in Texas Western District Court in 2013.

The Cherokee Nation of Mexico Texas and Coahuila Reservation and Church was headquartered in Brownsville, Texas, United States. Today they are an IRS 170(b)(1)(A)(i) organization, listed as a "Religion-Related, Spiritual Development" and Christian church, with Unconditional Tax Exemption, located in Dripping Springs, Texas.

See also
Cherokees in Albuquerque, New Mexico, an outlier branch of the Cherokee Nation of Oklahoma
Cherokee cultural citizenship
Cherokee heritage groups
Cherokees in Texas
Northern Cherokee of the Great Plains (the historic Louisiana Territory)

Notes

References
 Conley, Robert. A Cherokee Encyclopedia. Albuquerque: University of New Mexico Press, 2007. .

External links 
 Cherokee Nation of Mexico, official website

Cherokee heritage groups
Non-profit organizations based in Texas
Hays County, Texas
Protestantism in Texas
Unrecognized tribes in the United States